Abisag Tüllmann (7 October 1935 – 24 September 1996) was a German photographer.

Life 
Born in Hagen, Westphalia, Tüllmann, daughter of Hedwig and Franz Tüllmann († 28 July 1945), was born with the civil name Ursula Eva Tüllmann. Her maternal grandparents were Louise Adele and Isidor Fränkel. The grandfather, who worked as a merchant, came from a Jewish family. Since his wife, "Half-Jew" trained clerk according to Nazi terminology, his father had to sell his business in 1937. After changing jobs as a hairdresser and labourer, he was sent in 1944 to Lubawka (Silesia) as a forced labourer.

Since 1946, Tüllmann lived with her mother in Wuppertal, where she attended the women's secondary school, which she finished in 1952 with the Mittlere Reife. From 1952 to 1953, Tüllmann completed an internship as a carpenter. From 1953 to 1955 she studied interior design at the Werkkunstschule in Wuppertal-Vohwinkel for four semesters. After dropping out of her studies, she first worked as a technical draughtswoman and then, from 1956 to 1957, in the Wuppertal advertising photo company it copyright, which was run by the writer Paul Pörtner.

In 1957, Tüllmann moved from Wuppertal to Frankfurt. She learned photography as a trainee for a year with the advertising photographer Dieter Jörs. In 1958, she began working for the Frankfurter Allgemeine Zeitung as well as for the Frankfurter Rundschau and Frankfurter Neue Presse.

In May 1961, Tüllmann joined the Deutscher Journalisten-Verband and henceforth called herself a freelance photojournalist. In Frankfurt, she developed intensive contacts to the art and cultural scene. Her friends included the writers  and Ror Wolf as well as the graphic artist Hans Hillmann. At the same time, the city itself became a motif of her work, as documented by a book of photographs published in 1963 and laid out by Hans Michel. In addition, she had a great journalistic interest in Israel and reported in numerous reports from the crisis centres there.

Around 1970, she began teaching photography at the Deutsche Film- und Fernsehakademie Berlin and at colleges in Kassel, Mainz, Frankfurt and Hamburg.

Tüllmann died in Frankfurt at the age of 60. She was buried in the Frankfurt Main Cemetery.

Legacy 
Before her death, Tüllmann had given her theatre photography to the Deutsches Theatermuseum in Munich. Posthumously, the Prussian Heritage Image Archive took over the complete photojournalistic oeuvre.

On the basis of a testamentary disposition by the artist, the Abisag Tüllmann Foundation was founded in Frankfurt in September 2008, which is financed with the proceeds from the archive. In addition to promoting publications and exhibitions of the artist's work, it also aims to promote artistic photojournalism. To this end, an Abisag Tüllmann Prize is awarded.

Honours 
 1993: , Frankfurt
 1995: Sibylla-Merian-Förderpreis des hessischen Ministeriums für Kunst

Exhibitions 
 2010/2011: Abisag Tüllmann 1935–1996. Bildreportagen und Theaterfotografie. 2010 Historical Museum, Frankfurt, 2011 Museum of Photography, Berlin.

Publications 
 Großstadt. Foreword Richard Kirn; de./en./fr. Societät, Frankfurt 1963.
 Bettina Decke, Abisag Tüllmann: Betrifft: Rhodesia. Unterdrückung und Widerstand in einer Siedlerkolonie. Megapress, Edition Mega, Frankfurt 1974, .
 Kursbuch 59 – Bilderbuch. Mit Fotografien von Abisag Tüllmann, Giovanni Rinaldi,  and others. Rotbuch, Berlin 1980.
 Unsere Welt. Bilder aus dem Schauspielhaus Bochum. Spielzeit 1981/82. Bochum 1982.
 Jean-Christophe Ammann (ed.): Abisag Tüllmann – Photographien. Museum für Moderne Kunst, Frankfurt, 1995, .
 Abisag Tüllmann Photographien ; [anlässlich der Präsentation des Werkes von Abisag Tüllmann im Museum für Moderne Kunst im Frühjahr 1995].

Further reading 
 Ulrike May: Betrifft: Abisag Tüllmann. Biografische Notizen. In Martha Caspers (ed.): Abisag Tüllmann 1935–1996. Bildreportagen und Theaterfotografie. Ausstellung im Historischen Museum Frankfurt. Hatje-Cantz, Ostfildern 2011, .
 Kristina Lowis und Christina Stehr: „Was, um Himmels willen, verstehen Sie unter ‚Arbeitsabzug – keine Originale‘?“: Abisag Tüllmanns fotografischer Nachlass im Spannungsfeld zwischen analogem Archiv und digitaler Präsenz. In Rundbrief Fotografie. In Rundbrief Fotografie 27 (2020), 3, .

Documentary 
 Claudia von Alemann: Die Frau mit der Kamera: Porträt der Fotografin Abisag Tüllmann. 80 Minuten, Deutschland 2011.

Catalogue 
 Museum für Moderne Kunst (ed.): Photographien. Text contributions from Jean-Christophe Ammann and Olof Hansen. Frankfurt, 1995.
 Martha Caspers (ed.): Abisag Tüllmann 1935–1996. Bildreportagen und Theaterfotografie. Exhibition at the Historisches Museum Frankfurt. Hatje Cantz Verlag, Ostfildern 2011

References

External links 
 .
 Bildarchiv Preußischer Kulturbesitz: Bildmaterial von Abisag Tüllmann
  
   
 
 
 
 Informationen zu Abisag Tüllmann in der Deutschen Fotothek
 Abisag Tüllmann im Frankfurter Personenlexikon (Ulrike May) 
 https://bpk-archive.de/tuellmann/

Sources 
 Volker Breidecker: Immer im Umbruch. In Süddeutsche Zeitung, No 55, 8 March 2011, .

20th-century German photographers
German women photographers
1935 births
1996 deaths
People from Hagen
Burials at Frankfurt Main Cemetery
20th-century women photographers